Allen Raphael Ritter (born June 19, 1988) is an American record producer and songwriter. He has produced for a variety of artists, most notably Drake ("Controlla"), Travis Scott ("Pick Up the Phone"), Kanye West ("All Day", "Father Stretch My Hands"), Rihanna ("Work"), and Nicki Minaj, among others.

Biography
Ritter was born in Yonkers, New York, and grew up in Danbury, Connecticut. He taught himself to play piano in his youth and began producing music as a teenager in the mid-2000s. In 2007/2008, he connected with New York-based producer Vinylz online and the two later began working with Toronto producer Boi-1da who had already been working with Drake. Together, they have produced a number of hits for artists like Drake, Nicki Minaj, and Chris Brown. Ritter also co-produces with Metro Boomin, with whom he produced much Travis Scott's 2015 album Rodeo and Metro's 2018 album Not All Heroes Wear Capes, as well as other Toronto-based producers like Frank Dukes and Nineteen85.

As a solo artist, Ritter has worked on music for a number of years and released three singles in 2018.

Discography

Singles

Other work 

 Kingsway Music Library – Frank Dukes x Allen Ritter Vol. 1 (sample pack)

Awards and nominations

Production discography 
List of songs as producer or co-producer, with performing artists and other credited producers, showing year released and album name. Partial discography, adapted from Jaxsta.

† indicates songwriting credit only.

References

External links 
 
 

1988 births
American hip hop record producers
Songwriters from New York (state)
People from Yonkers, New York
Living people
Record producers from New York (state)
Trap musicians
American rhythm and blues musicians